Anything Once is a 1925 American silent romantic comedy film directed by Justin H. McCloskey and starring Tully Marshall, Gladys Walton, and Mathilde Brundage.

Plot
As described in a film magazine review, adventurer David Marvin meets Nixon, who sees in him the opportunity to rid his daughter Dorothy of a bogus Duke. The Duke, to bring disfavor on David, places some jewels on Marvin's person. Dorothy saves the situation.

Cast

References

Bibliography
 Munden, Kenneth White. The American Film Institute Catalog of Motion Pictures Produced in the United States, Part 1. University of California Press, 1997.

External links

1925 films
1925 comedy films
1920s English-language films
American silent feature films
Silent American comedy films
American black-and-white films
1920s American films